San Nicolò d'Arcidano is a comune (municipality) in the Province of Oristano in the Italian region Sardinia, located about 70 km northwest of Cagliari and about 25 km south of Oristano.

San Nicolò d'Arcidano borders the following municipalities: Guspini, Mogoro, Pabillonis, Terralba, Uras.

References

Cities and towns in Sardinia